The Opium Smugglers is a 1948 book by Ion Idriess. It was one of a number of books he wrote for children.

References

1944 non-fiction books
1944 children's books
Books by Ion Idriess
Australian non-fiction books
Australian children's books
Works about opium
Angus & Robertson books